Hot Water Extraction (HWE) is a method of carpet cleaning. It involves a combination of hot water and cleaning agents being injected into the fibers of a carpet at high pressure and the lifted soil being removed by a powerful vacuum.

Process

Though commonly called "steam cleaning", no actual steam is involved in the HWE cleaning process apart from steam that may escape incidentally from hot water. When the cleaning solution comes in contact with the carpet, it is 50 to 120 degrees Celsius, depending on the heat available from the cleaning unit. In a modern truck-mounted carpet cleaning machine, water can be heated under pressure to over 150 degrees Celsius, but after passing through high-pressure steel braided hoses and several manifolds, the water loses much of its heat.

HWE begins with preconditioning using a pre-spray cleaner (typically neutral or alkaline) being applied to the soiled surface, followed by light agitation with a grooming or pile brush. For heavily soiled areas a Counter-Rotating Brush (CRB) can be used after the appropriate dwell time. Next, the surface is passed over several times with a cleaning wand or rotary extractor to thoroughly rinse out the preconditioner, using an acidic solution to reduce the pH of the carpet fibers back to a neutral state. In the next stage, the carpet is dried using a fan or carpet dryer. The final stage is resetting the carpet pile to remove any unsightly wand lines, commonly referred to as "shark teeth", with a carpet groom or brush.

Hot water extraction machines
Professional machines range from portable machines, which use electricity to heat the water and power the water pump and vacuum motors, to larger truck-mounted machines. Truck-mounted machines are normally either powered by a stationary engine or PTO powered machines installed in a van or truck. Portable machines are able to access difficult to reach buildings and higher floors, while truck-mounted machines are more powerful and can clean and dry faster.

Consumer-grade and rental machines use similar technology to professional systems, but with less power and usually without an element to heat water. These units are not typically labeled as HWE systems, but are called "extration vacuum cleaners", and may have additional heads for cleaning non-fabric surfaces like hard floors. Alternatively, some consumer machines contain a heating element but no vacuum function, and are simply called "steam cleaners".

See also

Floor cleaning
Carpet cleaning
Vapor steam cleaning

References

Cleaning methods
Cleaning tools
Rugs and carpets